Kovar is an unincorporated community in Bastrop County, Texas, United States. It is located within the Greater Austin metropolitan area.

History
Kovar was named for early settler Martin Kovar, who came to the area around 1870. A church was organized by Reverend Jindrich Juren in 1894 and had 30 members in attendance, who had Czech and Moravian heritage. Agriculture and a cotton gin made up the community's economy. A post office was established at Kovar in 1903 and remained in operation until 1914, with Frank Rundus as postmaster. The community never developed fully and never recorded a population, but the community's economy eventually centered on ranching.

The movie Hope Floats was filmed at Sts. Peter and Paul's church in Kovar. It is located at the southeastern corner of Zimmerhanzel and Stolle Roads and a large SPJST hall is a short distance to the north. There are two cemeteries a quarter-mile west of the building.

Geography

Education
Kovar is served by the Smithville Independent School District.

References

Unincorporated communities in Texas
Unincorporated communities in Bastrop County, Texas